This was the first edition of the tournament, Damir Džumhur won the title defeating Daniel Muñoz de la Nava in the final

Seeds

Draw

Finals

Top half

Bottom half

References
 Main Draw
 Qualifying Draw

Morocco Tennis Tour - Casablanca II - Singles